The 2015–16 Quaid-e-Azam Trophy was the 58th edition of the Quaid-e-Azam Trophy, the premier domestic first-class cricket competition in Pakistan. It was contested by 16 teams representing eight regional associations and eight departments.

The Pakistan Cricket Board restructured the Quaid-e-Azam Trophy just one season after implementing the previous changes. The number of teams was reduced from 26 to 16 with 12 automatic qualifiers and four additional teams gaining entry via two new pre-qualifying competitions, one for regions and one for departments. The competition proper was contested by means of two round-robin group stages, with a final to determine the winner. Among the qualifiers was Federally Administered Tribal Areas, which competed in the Quaid-e-Azam Trophy first-class competition for the first time.

Following the completion of the preliminary group stages, six departments (Sui Northern Gas Pipelines Limited, National Bank of Pakistan, Water and Power Development Authority, United Bank Limited, Khan Research Laboratories and Sui Southern Gas Corporation) and two regions (Karachi Whites and Lahore Blues) qualified for the Super Eight stage of the competition. United Bank Limited and Sui Northern Gas Pipelines Limited topped the Super Eight groups to advance to the final, where Sui Northern Gas Pipelines Limited won by 6 wickets to defend their title.

Structure and competition format
Despite having unveiled a revised format in 2015 which was intended to last five seasons, the Pakistan Cricket Board decided to overhaul the structure after just one season. The number of teams was reduced from 26 down to 16, made up of eight regional associations and eight departments; six of each were automatically qualified based on their record in 2014–15, and the remainder had to earn their place through a corresponding qualifying tournament, although the bottom teams from 2014–15 (Quetta and Pakistan Television) were not eligible as they were relegated directly to Grade II cricket.

The sixteen teams were divided into two groups, with four regions and four departments in each. After a round-robin of matches, the top four teams in each group advanced to a second group stage, called the "Super Eight", with four teams in each group. After a further round-robin, the top team in each group advanced to the final.

Qualifying
Two qualifying competitions were held, one for regional associations and one for departments. Making it through from the regional competition were Federally Administered Tribal Areas, advancing to the Quaid-e-Azam Trophy first-class competition for the first time, and Lahore Blues. Sui Southern Gas Company (SSGC) and Khan Research Laboratories (KRL) qualified from the departments. Under the previous system, Karachi Port Trust had been set to return to first-class cricket having won the Patron's Trophy Grade II the previous season but following the restructuring, they missed out in the qualifying tournament.

Group stage

Tables

Results

Pool A

Round 1

Round 2

Round 3

Round 4

Round 5

Round 6

Round 7

Pool B

Round 1

Round 2

Round 3

Round 4

Round 5

Round 6

Round 7

Super Eight stage

Tables

Results

Group 1

Group 2

Final

Notes

References

External links
 Quaid-e-Azam Trophy 2015-16 - Official
 Quaid-e-Azam Trophy 2015-16 at ESPN Cricinfo

Domestic cricket competitions in 2015–16
2015 in Pakistani cricket
2016 in Pakistani cricket
2015–16 Quaid-e-Azam Trophy
Pakistani cricket seasons from 2000–01